Paul Michael Fuschillo (born 20 October 1948) was an English amateur footballer who played as a full back.

Career
Born in Islington, Fuschillo played non-league football for Wycombe Wanderers; he also made 28 appearances in the Football League for Blackpool and Brighton & Hove Albion.

Fuschillo was also a member of the British national side which failed to qualify for the 1972 Summer Olympics.

References

1948 births
Living people
English footballers
Wycombe Wanderers F.C. players
Blackpool F.C. players
Brighton & Hove Albion F.C. players
English Football League players
Association football fullbacks